Boit or Boiţ is a surname. Notable people with the surname include:

Charles Boit (1662—1727), Swedish painter 
Cristina Boiț (born 1968), Romanian discus thrower
Elizabeth Boit (1849–1932), American textile manufacturer
Mike Boit (born 1949), Kenyan middle distance athlete
Philip Boit (born 1971), Kenyan cross-county skier
Wilson Boit Kipketer (born 1973) Kenyan middle and long distance athlete